St. Senan's Hospital was a psychiatric hospital in Enniscorthy, County Wexford, Ireland.

History
The hospital, which was designed by James Bell and James Barry Farrell in the Italianate style, opened as the Enniscorthy Asylum in 1868. It became Enniscorthy Mental Hospital in the 1920s and went on to become St. Senan's Hospital in the 1950s. After the introduction of deinstitutionalisation in the late 1980s the hospital went into a period of decline and closed completely in 2015.

References

Hospitals in County Wexford
Senans
Hospital buildings completed in 1868
Hospitals established in 1868
Hospitals disestablished in 2015
1868 establishments in Ireland
Defunct hospitals in the Republic of Ireland
2015 disestablishments in Ireland